Live in Denmark 1976 is a live album by the British glam rock band Sweet, released in 1998. The album is a recording of a concert at Fyens Forum, Odense on 7 May 1976. In 2010 the album was reissued as Live in Concert Denmark 1976 on the ZYX Music label.

Track listing

References

The Sweet albums
1998 live albums
1976 live albums
Live glam rock albums